Gareth Leon Delve (born 30 December 1982) is a former Wales international rugby union player, and former captain of Gloucester. In late 2010, he moved to Australia where he went on to captain the Melbourne Rebels. His usual position is number 8.

Career

Wales and England
Delve was a pupil at Rumney High School in Cardiff and accepted a Rugby scholarship from Colston's Collegiate School in Bristol before signing a professional contract with Bath in 2001.

After a few frustrating seasons at Bath, he was named in the Welsh squad for the 2006 Six Nations Championship, and earned two caps during the tournament, making his debut against Scotland. He was also called up for the summer tour to Argentina in June 2006, and earned another two caps, as well as scoring a try in the second Test.

In the summer of 2007, he moved from Bath to Gloucester Rugby. He was appointed joint captain of Gloucester in 2009, a position he held in 2010, before he moved to Australia.

In March 2010, he was recalled to the Wales squad and selected in the starting line-up for the match versus Ireland. He was named in the preliminary squad for the 2011 Rugby World Cup but was ultimately left out of the final squad.

Australia
In March 2010, Delve signed with the Melbourne Rebels, and joined the team in October, in preparation for the 2011 Super Rugby season. The move to Melbourne saw Delve reconnect with former Bath Forwards Coach Mark Bakewell. Although there had been speculation that Delve might play blindside flanker, he became the Rebels regular No.8.
In February 2011, Delve was appointed the Rebels' vice captain, deputy to former Wallaby captain Stirling Mortlock. In Round 9 of the 2011 season, Delve became the first overseas player to captain an Australian Super Rugby side (v. Highlanders, in Melbourne).

In 2011, Delve earned a call up to the initial 45-man Welsh World Cup squad, training in Spala, Poland. He missed the first training session due to Rebels duties. He was to join the squad after the final games for the Rebels against the Western Force.

In June 2012, he re-signed with the Rebels for 2013. Rebels CEO Steven Boland said Delve had been wonderful ambassador for the Rebels. "His leadership has also been outstanding and given the upcoming retirement of our Captain Stirling Mortlock, Gareth will once again be an important part of our leadership group next year."

In May 2013, it was announced that Delve would leave the Rebels at the end of the season, along with head coach Damien Hill and fellow Rebels players James O'Connor, Cooper Vuna, Ged Robinson, Nick Phipps, Nic Henderson, James King, Tim Davidson and Richard Kingi. His last game as a Rebels player was a home game against New Zealand franchise the Highlanders, a match that also turned out to be the last Rebels match for head coach Damien Hill and players James O'Connor, Cooper Vuna, Ged Robinson, Nick Phipps and Nic Henderson. In front of over 12,000 spectators, the Rebels overcame a 24-point half-time deficit to achieve a remarkable 38–37 come-from-behind victory over the Highlanders, ending Delve's tenure as a Rebels player on a winning note.

Japan
It had been speculated in the Australian press that Delve would continue his rugby union career in Japan.
 It was officially confirmed that Delve would join NEC Green Rockets in the Japanese Top League for the next season.

Return to the UK
On 27 March 2015, it was announced Delve had signed a two-year contract with Welsh region Ospreys. He was released from his contract one year later.

Personal life
Late in 2010, while house hunting in Melbourne with his partner, Delve chanced upon a man allegedly assaulting a woman and attempting to push her into a car. It's alleged that the man attacked Delve, and was knocked to the ground. Delve called the police. The Melbourne Age hinted Delve behaved like a superhero, but to Delve "The good thing was that he started being aggressive towards me instead of towards the woman ... the way I was brought up you don't like seeing things like that happen. In the situation it felt like the right thing to step in."

Delve's parents are Steve Delve, a former prop and competitive bodybuilder, and Dolan Delve, née Taylor; both of whom are from Wales. When asked to describe some of his proudest moments, he replied that one was when "I [gave] my match jersey to my grandfather before he passed away so that was absolutely massive for me and something I'll always remember."

References

External links
Melbourne Rebels Player Profile
Gloucester Rugby profile
Wales profile

WRC Profile

1982 births
Living people
Bath Rugby players
British expatriates in Australia
British expatriates in Japan
Expatriate rugby union players in Australia
Expatriate rugby union players in Japan
Rugby union players from Cardiff
Rugby union number eights
Gloucester Rugby players
Melbourne Rebels players
Green Rockets Tokatsu players
People educated at Colston's School
Welsh expatriate rugby union players
Wales international rugby union players
Sportspeople from Gloucestershire
Ospreys (rugby union) players
Welsh rugby union players